Dortmund Airport  is a minor international airport located  east of Dortmund, North Rhine-Westphalia. It serves the eastern Rhine-Ruhr area, the largest urban agglomeration in Germany, and is mainly used for low-cost and leisure charter flights. In 2020 the airport served  1,220,624 passengers. The nearest major international airport is Düsseldorf Airport approx.  to the southwest.

History

Early years
The airport, originally located in the suburb of Brackel, was first served by commercial flights in 1925 by Aero Lloyd, which operated flights to Paris. By the business year 1927/1928, service had expanded to 2,589 commercial flights annually. During World War II the airport was used as a German air base, and was subsequently used by the British Royal Air Force. Service to Dortmund was not recommenced when German commercial air service was restarted in 1955. In 1960, the civil airfield was relocated to Dortmund-Wickede. The old airport was abandoned and occupied by British forces until the 1990s.

Little service
Over the next decades Düsseldorf Airport and Cologne Bonn Airport were the dominant commercial airports in the Rhine-Ruhr Area. Additionally Hannover Airport also covered some of the air travel needs of this region. Furthermore, the 257-km (160-mile) Sauerlandlinie opened in the late 1960s, connecting Dortmund with Frankfurt Airport in under two hours by car.

Commercial service was restored in 1979 with daily flights to Munich by Reise- und Industrieflug. Nuremberg and Stuttgart followed shortly afterwards. Following German Reunification in 1990, Dresden, Leipzig, Berlin, and London were added to the flight schedule. Reise- und Industrieflug and Nürnberger Flugdienst merged in 1990 and Eurowings was formed, which is still based in Dortmund.

Construction was started in 1998, and completed in 2000 on a new replacement terminal. This multi-level terminal prepared the airport for its resurgence.

Resurgence
From late 2000 onwards, Dortmund Airport has experienced a drastic increase in air traffic. In the 1990s weekly service had been generally restricted to a few turboprop flights to destinations within Germany, as well as occasional charter flights to warm-weather destinations. Since 2000, several new airlines have commenced service to Dortmund, many with mainline jets. Most of the air traffic today is by low cost airlines operating Boeing 737 or Airbus A320 family series aircraft to warm-weather destinations and business centres.

The first mass carrier at Dortmund Airport was Air Berlin, which began flights to London, Milan, and Vienna in 2002, supplementing its leisure routes to the Mediterranean. easyJet made Dortmund a hub in 2004, and Germanwings followed in 2007. Air Berlin ceased most non-leisure routes from Dortmund in 2005, but easyJet has taken over in this role. However, easyJet cancelled four of five destinations in 2012. To this day the relatively popular London-Luton route is the only one served by easyJet.

Since 2006 it has been carrying the name "Dortmund Airport 21", in reference to the fact that Dortmund's utility company, DSW21, is its major shareholder.

In October 2014, Air Berlin announced it was leaving Dortmund Airport entirely, cancelling their last remaining summer seasonal route to Palma de Mallorca. The airline had shut down several leisure routes from the airport in 2012.

As with easyJet in the 2000s, other low-cost carriers started opening routes from Dortmund Airport. Ryanair has progressively added new routes from Dortmund, mostly to destinations around the Mediterranean and the UK. At one point, Spanish low-cost airline Vueling offered flights to Barcelona, but they have been discontinued despite strong demand. However, Wizz Air has been the most significant contributor to the airport's resurgence. The Hungarian low-cost airline began servicing the airport in the mid 2000s by operating several routes to Eastern Europe, in large parts due to the Ruhr's significant Slavic community. In June 2020, in the midst of the COVID-19 pandemic, Wizzair announced that Dortmund Airport would become its 33rd base, the first in Germany. However, a year later, Wizz Air announced the closure of their Dortmund base which led to the termination of few routes.

Airlines and destinations
The following airlines operate regular scheduled and charter flights at Dortmund Airport:

Statistics

Ground transportation

To Dortmund and the Ruhr area
Dortmund Airport is served by an express bus to Dortmund main station, a shuttle bus to the nearby railway station Holzwickede/Dortmund Flughafen, a bus to the city's metro line U47, as well as a bus to the city of Unna.

To Düsseldorf
Travellers with destination Düsseldorf main station need to catch the AirportShuttle bus to nearby Holzwickede station. The shuttle bus leaves every 20 minutes in front of the terminal building. From Holzwickede station catch the RE 13 (Maas-Wupper-Express) towards Venlo. The train runs every hour and provides a direct connection to Düsseldorf, the travel time is approx. 60 minutes.

Other facilities
At one time Eurowings had its headquarters, the Dortmund Administrative Center (Verwaltungsstandort Dortmund), at the airport. It has been relocated to Düsseldorf in 2010.

Accidents and incidents
 On 3 January 2010, Air Berlin Flight 2450, operated by a Boeing 737-800 (D-ABKF) overran the end of the runway after an aborted take-off at high speed due to an airspeed discrepancy on the two pilots' instruments. There were no injuries among the 171 people on board.

See also
 Transport in Germany
 List of airports in Germany

References

External links

 
 

Airports established in 1925
1925 establishments in Germany
Transport in Dortmund
Dortmund